Ljubomir "Ljubo" Bandović (born 8 July 1976) is a Serbian actor. He has won many prestigious awards for acting in Serbia.

Biography
Ljubomir "Ljubo" Bandović was born in Ivangrad, SR Montenegro, SFR Yugoslavia. He studied at the University of Arts Faculty of Dramatic Arts. He has been a member of Yugoslav Drama Theatre since 2000. He has also been a member of several other houses, including: Belgrade International Theatre Festival, Belgrade Drama Theatre, Serbian National Theatre and BELEF.

In February 2009, he has won the "Zoran Radmilović" award for performance in a theatre show Ćeif. In August 2011, he has won Grand Prix "Naisa" award for the performances in The Sisters and The Enemy. In October 2011, he was the best actor of the 31st "Borini pozorišni dani" festival, for the performance in a theatre show Pazarni dan.

Personal life
He is married to Tatjana who is a painter.

References

External links

 
 Ljubomir Bandović at port.rs
 Савест нам дише за вратом at politika.rs
 Balkanskom ulicom - Ljubomir Bandović, glumac at youtube.com (Video)

1976 births
Living people
Serbian male actors
People from Berane
University of Belgrade Faculty of Dramatic Arts alumni
Serbs of Montenegro
Zoran Radmilović Award winners